Jakob Christian Lindberg Knudsen (14 September 1858 – 21 January 1917) was a Danish author, educator and clergyman.

Biography
Jakob  Knudsen was born  in Rødding, in the south of Denmark. Knudsen spent much of his childhood at Aggersborg in Hanherred. In his youth, he was largely home schooled  by his parents who followed the spiritual principals of Grundtvig. In 1862, the family moved to Dalum,  where his father was a teacher at Christen Kold Folk High School. In 1872, the family moved to Lunderskov where his father served the parishes of Jordrup and Lejrskov.

From 1875 to 1881, Jakob  Knudsen studied theology at the University of Copenhagen. He graduated in 1881 with a Cand.theol.  He started his career as a  teacher at Askov folk high school and later worked as a priest at the village of Mellerup in Randers.

His breakthrough as a writer came in 1899 with the book Den gamle præst (The Old Priest). In 1901, he moved with his family to Hillerød and in 1909 to Birkerød, where he devoted himself to writing.

Selected works
Den gamle præst (1899) 
Gjæring – Afklaring (1902) 
Inger (1906) 
Fremskridt (1907) 
Lærer Urup (1909)
To slægter (1910) 
Rodfæstet (1911) 
Angst (1912) 
Mod (1914)

References

Further reading
Bjerg, Svend (1982)   Jakob Knudsen. Erfaring og fortælling 
Schmidt, Povl (1984) Drømmens dør : læsninger i Jakob Knudsens forfatterskab (Odense: Odense Universitetsforlag)

External links 
 Entry in det store danske
Arkiv for Dansk Litteratur - Jakob Knudsen

1858 births
1917 deaths
Danish educators
Danish Lutheran clergy
People from Vejen Municipality
Danish male novelists
19th-century Danish novelists
20th-century Danish novelists
20th-century Danish male writers